

Released films

The following is the list of Malayalam films released in the year 2010.

Malayalam films

Dubbed films

Notable deaths

References

2010
Lists of 2010 films by country or language
 2010
2010 in Indian cinema